American actress Winona Ryder has been recognized with multiple awards and nominations for her work in film and television. At age 23, she has been nominated for Best Supporting Actress at the 66th Academy Awards for her performance's in The Age of Innocence—making her one of the youngest artists in the Academy of Motion Picture Arts and Sciences to be nominated. The following year, at the 67th Academy Awards, Ryder's performance in Little Women earned her another nomination for the Best Actress. Ryder earned a Golden Globe nomination in the coming of age drama Mermaids (1990). Ryder won a Golden Globe Award for Best Supporting Actress and an Academy Award nomination in the same category for her role in The Age of Innocence in 1993, as well as another Academy Award nomination for Best Actress for her role in the film adaptation of Little Women the following year. In 1995, she was nominated for a SAG Award as part of the cast of How to Make an American Quilt. In 2010, she was nominated for two Screen Actors Guild Awards: as the lead actress in When Love Is Not Enough: The Lois Wilson Story and as part of the cast of Black Swan. For her performance as Joyce Byers in the Netflix supernatural horror series Stranger Things, she earned a Golden Globe nomination and two SAG nominations, winning a SAG as part of the show’s ensemble in 2017.

Recognitions

See also
 List of Academy Award records
 List of actors with two or more Academy Award nominations in acting categories
 List of actors with Academy Award nominations
 List of stars on the Hollywood Walk of Fame
 List of actors with Hollywood Walk of Fame motion picture stars

Notes

References

Footnotes

Bibliography

External links 
  

Ryder, Winona